Syriac-language manuscripts of the New Testament include some of the earliest and most important witnesses for textual criticism of the New Testament. Over 350 Syriac manuscripts of the New Testament have survived into the 21st century. The majority of them represent the Peshitta version. Only a very few manuscripts represent Old Syriac versions. Some manuscripts represent a mixed or eclectic text.

Manuscripts housed at the British Library, Additional Manuscripts

Manuscripts housed in the Bodleian Library 
 Dawkins 27,
 Huntington MS 133 — Bodleian Library 
 Huntington MS 587, Bodleian Library 
 Marsh 699, Bodleian Library

Manuscripts housed in the Vatican Library 
 Codex Vaticanus Syriac 12
 Codex Vaticanus Syriac 19
 Codex Vaticanus Syriac 267
 Codex Vaticanus Syriac 268

Manuscripts housed in other collections 
 Egerton MS 704 — Old Testament, 17th century
 Codex Phillipps 1388 — the four Gospels, 5th/6th century
 Khaburis Codex — 22 books of the New Testament, 12th century
 Rabbula Gospels — the four Gospels, 586
 Morgan MS 783
 Morgan MS 784
 Paris syr. MS 296, Io
 Schøyen Ms. 2080 — 1 Corinthians-2 Corinthians
 Schøyen Ms. 2530 
 Ms. Sinai syr. 3
 StL München syr. 8

See also 
 Syriac versions of the Bible
 Biblical manuscript
 British Library Syriac Manuscript Collection
 List of the Coptic New Testament manuscripts

References

Further reading 
 William Aldis Wright, Catalogue of the Syriac manuscripts in the British Museum
 Erwin Nestle, Syrische Übersetzungen
 Caspar René Gregory, Textkritik des Neuen Testaments, (Leipzig 1902), Vol. 2, pp. 507–528.
 Julius Assfalg, Syrische Handschriften; syrische karšunische, christlich-palästinische, neusyrische und mandäische Handschriften (Wiesbaden 1963).
 The Four Gospels in Syriac Transcribed from the Sinaitic Palimpsest Edited by R.L. Bensley, J. Rendel Harris & F.C. Burkitt, (Cambridge 1894)

External links 
 A collection of Syriac manuscripts available on-line
 The Syrian Orthodox Monastery of St. Mark in Jerusalem

Syriac
Peshitta manuscripts
Syriac
Syriac